André van de Werve de Vorsselaer (10 April 1908 – 6 October 1984) was a Belgian fencer. He won a bronze medal in the team foil event at the 1948 Summer Olympics.

References

1908 births
1984 deaths
Andre
Belgian male fencers
Olympic fencers of Belgium
Fencers at the 1936 Summer Olympics
Fencers at the 1948 Summer Olympics
Olympic bronze medalists for Belgium
Olympic medalists in fencing
Sportspeople from Antwerp
Medalists at the 1948 Summer Olympics